Coed-y-paen is a village in South Wales, situated at the south-eastern end of Llandegfedd Reservoir,  north-west of Llangybi. HM Prison Prescoed, a Category D prison, is located nearby.

The village has one public house, the Carpenters Arms.

Christchurch
The village church, Christchurch, was designed in 1848 by architect Sir Matthew Digby-Wyatt.

The church was built as a chapel of ease to the parish church of Llangybi. It was conveyed to the Church in Wales in 1861. A fine  Victorian church of the Early English style, it comprises a nave and chancel and a western tower of three floors. It has a single bell.

References

External links
 Village website

Villages in Monmouthshire